The 2009 Air New Zealand Cup Final was a rugby union match played on Saturday 7 November 2009. It was the fourth Air New Zealand Cup final to determine the winner of the 2009 Air New Zealand Cup and the 33rd winner of New Zealand's premier provincial rugby competition.

It was the last Air New Zealand Cup Final with the competition structure set to change for the 2010 season.

Canterbury were the first team to qualify for the final when they beat Hawke's Bay 20 points to 3 on 30 October. Wellington gained the second spot after beating Southland 34 points to 21 on 31 October.

Match details

See also
 2009 Air New Zealand Cup
 2009 Air NZ Cup Finals
 2009 Air NZ Cup Round-Robin

References

Final